Optical contact bonding is a glueless process whereby two closely conformal surfaces are joined together, being held purely by intermolecular forces.

History
Isaac Newton has been credited with the first description of conformal interaction observed through the interference phenomenon known as Newton's rings, though it was S. D. Poisson in 1823 who first described the optical characteristics of two identical surfaces in contact. It was not until the 19th century that objects were made of such precision that the binding phenomenon was observed. The clinging together was described as "wringing together", or as "ansprengen" in German. By 1900 optical contact bonding was being employed in the construction of optical prisms, and the following century saw further research into the phenomenon at the same time that ideas of inter-atom interactions were first being studied.

Explanation
Intermolecular forces such as Van der Waals forces, hydrogen bonds, and dipole-dipole interactions are typically not sufficiently strong to hold two apparently conformal rigid bodies together, since the forces drop off rapidly with distance, and the actual area in contact between the two bodies is small due to surface roughness and minor imperfections.

However, if the bodies are conformal to an accuracy of better than 10 angstroms (1 nanometer), then a sufficient surface area is in close enough contact for the intermolecular interactions to have an observable real world physical manifestation—that is, the two objects stick together. Such a condition requires a high degree of accuracy and surface smoothness, which is typically found in optical components, such as prisms.

Production of an optical contact bond

In addition to both surfaces' being practically conformal (in practice often completely flat), the surfaces must also be extremely clean and free from any small contamination that would prevent or weaken the bond—including grease films and specks of dust. For bonding to occur, the surfaces need only to be brought together; the intermolecular forces draw the bodies into the lowest energy conformation, and no pressure needs to be applied.

Advantages

Since the method requires no binder, balsam or glue, the physical properties of the bound object are the same as the objects joined. Typically, glues and binders are more heat sensitive or have undesirable properties compared to the actual bodies being joined. The use of optical contact bonding allows the production of a final product with properties as good as the bulk solid. This can include temperature and chemical resistances, spectral absorption properties and reduced contamination from bonding materials.

Uses

Originally the process was confined to optical equipment such as prisms—the earliest examples being made around 1900. Later the range of use was expanded to microelectronics and other miniaturised devices.

See also

 
 
 , which are joined temporarily in a similar fashion

References

External links
 Description of production of experimental 'Lab on a chip' via contact bonding RSC Publishing (Royal Society of Chemistry)
 Optical Fabrication: Optical Contacting Grows More Robust by Chris Myatt, Nick Traggis, and Kathy Li Dessau.

Optics
Intermolecular forces
Materials science